Magala-Cad District is a district in the northwestern Awdal region of Somaliland. The District is on the eastern edge of Awdal and is exclusively inhabited by the Reer Nuur and Jibrain subclans of the Gadabuursi clan.

See also
Administrative divisions of Somaliland
Regions of Somaliland
Districts of Somaliland

References

Magala-Cad

Districts of Somaliland